Ma'anshan No.2 High School()is an institution of secondary education in Ma'anshan, Anhui Province of the People's Republic of China.

History 
Ma'anshan No.2 High School is founded in 1957,has a long history and a widespread fame between civilians of Ma'anshan .

See also
Ma'anshan

References

External links
Official website of Ma'anshan No.2 High School

High schools in Anhui
Educational institutions established in 1957
1957 establishments in China